Caldervale may refer to:

 Caldervale, Queensland, a locality in the Blackall-Tambo Region, Queensland, Australia
 Calder Valley line, a railway line in Northern England, previously known as the Caldervale line
 Caldervale, also known as 'Fin Me Oot', a former mining village near Blantyre, South Lanarkshire in Scotland

See also
Calderdale